The 1969–70 Chicago Black Hawks season was the Hawks' 44th season in the NHL, and the club was coming off a sixth-place finish in the East Division in 1968–69, failing to qualify for the playoffs for the first time since the 1957–58 season.  Despite missing the playoffs, the Black Hawks had a record of 34–33–9, earning 77 points, as they had their ninth consecutive season of playing over .500 hockey.

During the off-season, Chicago claimed goaltender Tony Esposito from the Montreal Canadiens in the intra-league draft on June 11, 1969.  The Hawks also named Pat Stapleton as their new team captain.  The Black Hawks did not have a captain for the 1968–69 season, as the spot was not filled after former captain Pierre Pilote was traded during the 1968 off-season.

The Black Hawks would begin the season very slow, as they lost their opening five games to quickly fall into the East Division cellar.  Chicago would then rebound, and after 35 games, the Hawks had a 15–15–5 record.  The Black Hawks would then get hot, as they went on a seven-game winning streak, and continued to play great hockey for the rest of the season, as Chicago won a franchise record 45 games, earning a club record 99 points tied with Boston Bruins for first overall. However, since Chicago won five more games, they finished in first place for the second time in franchise history and were awarded the Prince of Wales Trophy.

Offensively, the Hawks were led by Stan Mikita, who scored a team high 39 goals, 47 assists and 86 points, as he finished third in the NHL scoring race.  Bobby Hull had another solid season, scoring 38 goals and 67 points, while Pit Martin had 30 goals and 63 points.  Team captain Pat Stapleton led the defense with 42 points, while Keith Magnuson had a club record 213 penalty minutes, along with a club high +38 rating.

In goal, Tony Esposito emerged as one of the top goaltenders in the league, as he won a club record 38 games, while posting a 2.17 GAA and a team record 15 shutouts.  Esposito was awarded the Calder Memorial Trophy and the Vezina Trophy for his efforts.

The Hawks opened the playoffs against the Detroit Red Wings in the East Division semi-finals.  The Red Wings finished the season with a 40–21–15 record, earning 95 points, which was good for third in the East Division.  The series opened with two games at Chicago Stadium, and the Black Hawks used home ice to their advantage, as they defeated Detroit by scores of 4–2 in both games to take the early series lead.  The series shifted to the Detroit Olympia for the next two games, however, Chicago stayed hot, as they once again won both games by scores of 4–2 to sweep the series and advance to the next playoff round.

Chicago would face the Boston Bruins in the East Division finals.  Both teams finished the season with 99 points, however, since Boston had a record of 40–17–19, which was five wins less than Chicago, the Black Hawks were awarded home ice advantage.  The Bruins had defeated the New York Rangers in their opening round.  The series opened in Chicago, however, it was the Bruins who took control of the series, winning both games at Chicago Stadium by scores of 6–3 and 4–1 to take the series lead.  The series moved to the Boston Garden for the next two games, and the Bruins easily knocked off the Black Hawks, winning the third game by a 5–2 score, then clinching the series with a 5–4 victory in the fourth game, sweeping the Black Hawks.

Season standings

Game log

Regular season

Chicago Black Hawks 4, Detroit Red Wings 0

Boston Bruins 4, Chicago Black Hawks 0

Season stats

Scoring leaders

Goaltending

Playoff stats

Scoring leaders

Goaltending

Draft picks
Chicago's draft picks at the 1969 NHL Amateur Draft held at the Queen Elizabeth Hotel in Montreal, Quebec.

References

Sources
Hockey-Reference
Rauzulu's Street
Goalies Archive
HockeyDB
National Hockey League Guide & Record Book 2007

Chicago Blackhawks seasons
Chicago
Chicago